Coventry is a city in the West Midlands, England.

Coventry may also refer to:

Places

United States
 Coventry, Connecticut
 Coventry, New York
 Coventry, Rhode Island
 Coventry, Vermont, a New England town
 Coventry (CDP), Vermont, the main village in the town
 Coventry Township, Summit County, Ohio
 Coventry Village, a commercial district in Cleveland Heights, Ohio

Military
 HMS Coventry, names of several former warships of the Royal Navy
 Coventry armoured car, a British four-wheel-drive armoured fighting vehicle

Arts and entertainment
 "Coventry Carol", a Christmas carol dating from the 16th century
 Coventry (Phish festival), a 2004 Phish music festival
 "Coventry" (short story), a short story by Robert A. Heinlein
 Coventry, a fictional location in the movie Twitches
 Sergeant Coventry, a local police officer in the Sherlock Holmes' short story Thor Bridge

People
 Charles Coventry (disambiguation)
 Francis Coventry (1725–c.1754), English satirist
 George Coventry, 3rd Baron Coventry (1628–1680) 
 George Coventry, 6th Earl of Coventry (1722–1809)
 George Coventry, 9th Earl of Coventry (1838–1930)
 Gertrude Mary Coventry (1886–1964), Scottish painter
 Gordon Coventry (1901–1968), Australian rules footballer
 Kirsty Coventry (born 1983), Zimbabwean swimmer and world record holder
 Paul Coventry (born 1952), English rugby league footballer of the 1970s and 1980s
 Robert McGowan Coventry (1855–1941), Scottish painter
 Syd Coventry (1899–1976), Australian rules footballer
 Thomas Coventry, 1st Baron Coventry (1578–1640)
 Thomas Coventry, 1st Earl of Coventry (c.1629–1699)
 William Coventry, 5th Earl of Coventry (c.1676–1751)
 Coventry Patmore (1823–1896), English poet and critic

Other uses
 3009 Coventry, an asteroid
 Coventry Health Care, a managed health care company in the US
 Coventry (horse), American racehorse
 Coventry Building Society
 Coventry City F.C., a football club who compete in the English league system

See also
 Coventry Climax, a Coventry-based forklift truck, fire pump, and speciality engine manufacturer
 Coventry Blitz, the 1940 German bombing of Coventry, England
 Send to Coventry, an English idiom meaning to deliberately ostracise someone
 South Coventry (disambiguation)
 East Coventry Township, Chester County, Pennsylvania, US
 North Coventry Township, Chester County, Pennsylvania, US
 South Coventry Township, Chester County, Pennsylvania, US